Nukatovo (Noqat) is a rural locality (a selo) in Inzersky Selsoviet, Beloretsky District, Bashkortostan, Russia. The population was 148 as of 2010. There are 2 streets.

Geography 
Nukatovo is located 109 km northwest of Beloretsk (the district's administrative centre) by road. Aryshparovo is the nearest rural locality.

References 

Rural localities in Beloretsky District